Lepisiota capensis, commonly known as the small black sugar ant, is an Old World ant in the subfamily Formicinae. It is found in countries of the Afrotropical, Malagasy, Oriental, and Palaearctic regions.

Subspecies
Lepisiota capensis acholli Weber, 1943 – Sudan
Lepisiota capensis anceps Forel, 1916 – DRC, Kenya
Lepisiota capensis guineensis Mayr, 1902 – Ghana, Ivory Coast, Kenya
Lepisiota capensis issore Weber, 1943 – Sudan
Lepisiota capensis junodi Forel, 1916 – South Africa
Lepisiota capensis laevis Santschi, 1913 – Senegal
Lepisiota capensis lunaris Emery, 1893 – Sri Lanka
Lepisiota capensis minuta Forel, 1916 – South Africa
Lepisiota capensis simplex Forel, 1892 – Kenya, Lesotho, Saudi Arabia, Somalia, Zimbabwe, Bangladesh, India
Lepisiota capensis simplicoides Forel, 1907 – South Africa
Lepisiota capensis specularis Santschi, 1935 – DRC
Lepisiota capensis subopaciceps Santschi, 1937 – Angola
Lepisiota capensis thoth Weber, 1943 – Sudan

References

 https://www.itis.gov/servlet/SingleRpt/SingleRpt?search_topic=TSN&search_value=577087
 http://animaldiversity.org/accounts/Lepisiota_capensis/classification/#Lepisiota_capensis

External links

 at antwiki.org

Formicinae
Hymenoptera of Asia
Insects described in 1862